Emil Ritter von Škoda (18 November 1839 – 8 August 1900) was a Bohemian engineer and industrialist, founder of Škoda Works, the predecessor of today's Škoda Auto and Škoda Transportation.

Life and work

Born Emil Škoda in Pilsen (Czech: Plzeň) on 18 November 1839 to a physician and politician František Škoda, and mother Anna Říhová. Škoda studied engineering in Prague and Karlsruhe and in 1866 became chief engineer of the machine factory of Ernst Fürst von Waldstein-Wartenberg, founded in 1859 at Pilsen. He bought the factory three years later, in 1869, and began to expand it, building a railway connection to the facility in 1886 and adding an arms factory in 1890 to produce machine guns for the Austro-Hungarian Army. His facilities continued to expand over the next decade, and he incorporated his holdings in 1899 as the Škoda Works, which would become famous for its arms production in both World War I and World War II and for a wide range of other industrial and transportation products.

Notes

External links
 Biography in Czech (archived link)
  Emil Škoda: Czech or German? (Czech-language article)

1839 births
1900 deaths
19th-century Czech businesspeople
19th-century Austrian businesspeople
Czech engineers
Austrian knights
People from Plzeň
Emil
Czech industrialists